Los pecados de Bárbara is a Mexican dramedy web television series produced by Mónica Lozano and Eamon O'Farrill for Televisa. The production of the series began on 11 March 2019, and was announced on 15 March 2019. It is originally developed by Kirén Miret and Beto López. The plot revolves around Bárbara (Diana Bovio) a woman of irreverent personality who, after an absence of 19 years, is forced to return to her hometown, Santa Prudencia.

The first season has locations in Huichapan, Hidalgo, and the Mexico City. It originally released via streaming on Blim TV on 15 November 2019. And it is scheduled to premiere on television on 6 January 2020 on Las Estrellas.

Cast 
 Diana Bovio as Bárbara
 Antonio Fortier as Jero
 Blanca Guerra as Matilde
 Irán Castillo as Coqui
 Ana Martin as Inés
 Regina Orozco as Lola
 Grettell Valdez as Gloria
 Mauricio Isaac as Félix
 Raquel Becerra as Odaya
 Albi De Abreu as Bosco de Agostini

References

External links 
 

Televisa original programming
Spanish-language television shows
Blim TV original programming
2019 Mexican television series debuts
2010s Mexican television series
Television series by Televisa
Las Estrellas original programming